The Cayman Islands Classic, operated by Caymax Sports Ltd., is a preseason college basketball tournament that takes place in late November of each year, at John Gray Gymnasium in the Cayman Islands. The Cayman Basketball Classic is expected to mirror other popular NCAA preseason basketball tournaments like Hawaii’s Maui Invitational Tournament or the Bahamas’ Battle 4 Atlantis. The First Tournament started 20 November 2017 and concluded on 22 November 2017. The Mountain West sponsors the tournament, as a result a Mountain West team will be in the preseason tournament every year.

Champions

Brackets 
* – Denotes overtime period

2022 
The tournament began on November 21, 2022 and will conclude on November 23, 2022.

2021 
The 2021 tournament was postponed to 2022 due to existing COVID-19 travel restrictions in the Cayman Islands.

2020 
The 2020 Cayman Islands Classic was canceled due to the NCAA changing the starting date of college basketball as a result of the COVID-19 pandemic.

2019

2018 
Source:. Source:

2017 
Source:

References

External links
Cayman Islands Classic

College basketball competitions
Recurring sporting events established in 2017
2017 establishments in the Cayman Islands
Basketball in the Cayman Islands